Henrik Wiehe (9 February 1927 – 1 July 1987) was a Danish film actor. He appeared in 30 films between 1950 and 1974. He was born in Frederiksberg, Denmark and died in Denmark.

Selected filmography
 Som sendt fra himlen (1951)
 This Is Life (1953)
 We Who Go the Kitchen Route (1953)
 Blændværk (1955)
 Hvad vil De ha'? (1956)
 Færgekroen (1956)
 Father of Four on Bornholm (1959)
 Baronessen fra benzintanken (1960)
 Barbara (1961)
 Det støver stadig (1962)
 Martha (1967)
 Mig og min lillebror og storsmuglerne (1968)
 Me and My Kid Brother and Doggie (1969)
 Me, Too, in the Mafia (1974)

External links

1927 births
1987 deaths
Danish male film actors
People from Frederiksberg
20th-century Danish male actors